"Salute" is a poem by the Australian writer Sydney Elliott Napier. During World War I he served with the First Australian Imperial Force. The poem was written when Napier was assistant editor of The Sydney Mail and was first published in that paper on 21 April 1937.

Use of the poem
In 2014 "Salute" was recited at the Dawn Service at the Sydney Cenotaph in Martin Place by the Minister for Veterans Affairs, Victor Dominello. In 2019 the poem was recited by the Premier of New South Wales, Gladys Berejiklian.

References

Military life
Poems about death
World War I poems
Australian poems
1937 poems